Richard M. Brett (September 3, 1903 – September 7, 1989) was an American conservationist and author.

Biography

Early life
Brett was born in Darien, Connecticut and spent most of his life in Woodstock, Vermont, and Fairfield, Connecticut.  Brett was a graduate of the Taft School, Williams College, and the Yale School of Forestry.

Career

Brett served as treasurer (appointed 1926) and general manager of Macmillan Publishing.  After serving in World War II, Brett was the business manager of the New York Public Library from 1947 until 1953.

Conservationist

After retirement in 1953, Brett moved to Vermont, where he set up a tree farm with habitats for wildlife at Hawk's Hill in East Barnard. He served as a trustee of the Vermont Natural Resources Council.  Brett later donated his Hawk's Hill tree farm to the New England Forestry Foundation.

Military service

Brett served in the Army Air Corps during World War II.

Bibliography 

 Country Journal Woodlot Primer: The Right Way to Manage Your Woodland by Richard M. Brett (1983)
 Primer on Aging by Richard M. Brett (1988)
 An inquiry into flood plains by Richard M Brett (1973)

See also 

 George Edward Brett
 George Platt Brett, Sr.
 George Platt Brett
 Macmillan Publishers (United States)

References 

American conservationists
1903 births
1989 deaths
United States Army Air Forces soldiers
United States Army Air Forces personnel of World War II
Writers from Fairfield, Connecticut
Yale School of Forestry & Environmental Studies alumni
Williams College alumni